The third season of Indonesian Idol aired on April 21, 2006 and concluded on August 19, 2006. Indra Lesmana, Titi DJ and Dimas Djayadiningrat all returned as judges, and Indy Barends replaced Meuthia Kasim as the fourth judge. Indy was a former host of talk show Ceriwis. VJ MTV Daniel Mananta was introduced as the new host on Indonesian Idol replacing Irgi Fahrezi.

Ihsan Tarore won the competition with Dirly Sompie as the first runner-up and Ghea Oktarin finishing third. It was the second season to have a finale with two male contestants, with the second season being the first.

Auditions
Auditions were held in five cities in the following order:

Elimination round
The elimination rounds were held from April 11–13, 2006.

Workshop Round
The workshop round featured 28 contestants divided by gender with the 14 male contestants singing on Fridays and the 14 female contestants on Saturdays. There were three shows each week for the three weeks of the workshop rounds.

Top 28

Top 20

Top 14

Wild Card Round

Spectacular Show

Spectacular Show 1 – Platinum 12

Spectacular Show 2 – Ayo Dansa

Spectacular Show 3 – Kreasi dan Ekspresi

Spectacular Show 4 – Colourful Love

Spectacular Show 5 – Idol in Action

Spectacular Show 6 – Populer Lagi

Spectacular Show 7 – Audisiku

Spectacular Show 8 – Rock

Spectacular Show 9 – Dua Warna

Spectacular Show 10

Grand Final

Guest performances

Elimination Chart

References

Indonesian Idol
2006 Indonesian television seasons